Takamisugi Takakatsu (born 1 March 1961 as Takashi Kanao) is a former sumo wrestler from Kawasaki, Kanagawa, Japan. His highest rank was komusubi. He is now  the head coach of Tokiwayama stable, renamed from Chiganoura stable.

Career
Kanao practised judo in elementary and junior school, where he also excelled at painting and artwork. Because of his large size he also took part in team sumo competitions at school and regularly placed the team in the top three. Upon his graduation he joined Futagoyama stable in March 1976. It was a prestigious heya to join, as it was run by former yokozuna Wakanohana Kanji I and contained a number of top division stars including popular ōzeki Takanohana Kenshi.

Initially fighting under his own surname, Kanao adopted the shikona of Futagonishiki in 1977 but switched to Takamisugi two years later. In January 1981, after five years in the unsalaried divisions, he reached sekitori level upon promotion to the second highest jūryō division, and he made the top makuuchi division just three tournaments later in July 1981. He initially struggled with injuries and after a number of setbacks, including a short spell back in the third makushita division, he made a top division kachi-koshi at the third attempt in January 1984, and established himself in makuuchi. He dropped back to jūryō in January 1987 but was re-promoted after winning the jūryō championship or yūshō in March with a 13–2 record. In November 1987 he defeated Ōnokuni in the latter's debut tournament as a yokozuna to earn his only kinboshi or gold star.

Takamisugi remained a rank-and file maegashira for nearly all his top division career. Although he reached komusubi twice, in January 1991 and January 1993, he recorded a losing score on both occasions. He holds the record for the most top division tournaments without ever winning a special prize, at 71. In 1993 his stable merged with Fujishima stable and he became a stablemate of ōzeki (later yokozuna) Takanohana Kōji, whom he had fought eight times previously without beating. In November 1995 he fell into jūryō once more and announced his retirement at the age of 34 after losing his first three matches.

Retirement from sumo

He remained in sumo as a coach at Futagoyama stable (later renamed Takanohana stable). Unable to purchase toshiyori kabu or elder stock, he borrowed elder names instead. He was known as Fujishima (until the retirement of stablemate Wakanohana Masaru), then Otowayama (until the retirement of Takanonami) and then Tokiwayama Oyakata. Along with five other oyakata (Magaki, Ōnomatsu, Otowayama, Ōtake and Futagoyama), he was forced to leave the Nishonoseki ichimon or group of stables in January 2010 after declaring his support for his former stablemate Takanohana's unsanctioned bid to be elected to the board of directors of the Sumo Association. In April 2016 he took over the running of the Chiganoura stable upon the retirement of the previous head, ex-sekiwake Masudayama. In October 2018 he became the head coach of Takakeishō and other wrestlers formerly of the defunct Takanohana stable. Takakeishō won the tournament championship in November 2018 and was promoted to ōzeki the following year, although he had to pull out of his ōzeki debut tournament in May 2019 with an injury. Chiganoura apologized to the Sumo Association for Takakeishō's decision to re-enter the tournament only to have to withdraw once again, and made sure Takakeishō did not appear at the stable's end of tournament party. In November 2020, as former Chiganoura owner Masudayama's retirement approached, as part of a previous agreement, former Takamisugi and former Masudayama swapped back their elder names, and former Takamisugi changed the name of the stable to his original elder name, Tokiwayama.

In July 2021 he was demoted to the lowest rung in the Sumo Association's hierarchy of toshiyori after his wrestler Takagenji was dismissed from sumo for cannabis use.

Personal life
He has a fine singing voice and is often called upon to display his talents at sumo functions. His nickname when active was Doraemon because of his facial resemblance to the popular manga/anime character. His wife is a former disc jockey.

Fighting style
Takamisugi liked a solid frontal pushing attack, and relied almost exclusively on oshisumo and tsuppari (thrusting). The push out or oshidashi was the winning kimarite in nearly half his sekitori matches. He usually lost if his opponents were able to grab hold of his mawashi or belt. He very rarely employed throwing moves; his most common throw was the beltless kotenage, or armlock throw.

Career record

See also
Glossary of sumo terms
List of sumo tournament second division champions
List of past sumo wrestlers
List of sumo elders
List of komusubi

References

External links
Complete career record

1961 births
Living people
Japanese sumo wrestlers
People from Kawasaki, Kanagawa
Sumo people from Kanagawa Prefecture
Komusubi